Mozilla Corp. v. FCC, 940 F. 3d 1 (D.C. Cir., 2019) was a ruling the United States Court of Appeals for the District of Columbia Circuit in 2019 related to net neutrality in the United States. The case centered on the Federal Communications Commission (FCC)'s decision in 2017 to rollback its prior 2015 Open Internet Order, reclassifying Internet services as an information service rather than as a common carrier, deregulating principles of net neutrality that had been put in place with the 2015 order. The proposed rollback had been publicly criticized during the open period of discussion, and following the FCC's issuing of the rollback, several states and Internet companies sued the FCC. These cases were consolidated into the one led by the Mozilla Corporation.

The Appeals Court ruled in favor of the FCC in October 2019, relying on the Supreme Court decision of National Cable & Telecommunications Ass'n v. Brand X Internet Services (2005) that the FCC has such authority to reclassify Internet services, and thus allowed the rollback. However, the Court ruled against the FCC in attempting to block state- and local-level laws that regulated the Internet, enabling states to pass net neutrality legislation.

Background
Net neutrality in the United States has been of concern since the Internet became open to public use through Internet service providers (ISPs). Net neutrality broadly encompasses the idea that all data traffic on the Internet should be treated equal, counter to past and planned actions of ISPs to offered tiered service plans that block or throttle access to selected sites at lower payment tiers, among other provisions. Within the United States, proponents of net neutrality, which typically includes Democrats and large technology companies, believe it is necessary to prevent ISPs from blocking access to Internet services or to throttle the connection to these services as to maintain an open flow of information across the Internet without discrimination. Opponents of net neutrality, principally Republicans and ISPs, argue that the ability to offer tiered rates of service would help promote competition in providing Internet service across America, and enforced net neutrality regulations would stifle growth.

A central facet of the debate around net neutrality is how ISPs are classified under the Communications Act of 1934. Under this act, they may either treated as "information service" under Title I of the Act, or as a "common carrier service" under Title II. Common carrier classification under Title II would mean that the FCC, which is granted authority to oversee communication services in the United States, could apply regulations to ISPs, which would include enforcing the principles of net neutrality. But under Title I, the FCC would not have significant authority to regulate ISPs. The FCC's authority to classify ISPs in this matter was upheld in the Supreme Court case National Cable & Telecommunications Ass'n v. Brand X Internet Services in 2005, based principle on the Chevron deference for the judiciary to allow federal agencies' interpretations of ambiguous Congressional language. With Brand Xs ruling left in place the FCC's decision to classified cable-based ISPs as information services under Title I.

Case background
The FCC in the early 2010s, while under the Barack Obama administration, were favorable to implementing net neutrality positions. The first FCC Commissioner in Obama's term, Julius Genachowski, was a strong proponent of net neutrality. Tom Wheeler, appointed as the new FCC Commissioner in 2013, had stated he was for an open Internet but favored the notion of "fast lanes" for some traffic,  but eventually agreed to full net neutrality goals as to maintain the goals of an open Internet. The FCC introduced the FCC Open Internet Order 2010 that enshrined principles of net neutrality. The order was challenged by ISPs, and in 2014, the DC Appeals Court ruled in Verizon Communications Inc. v. FCC that the FCC did not have the authority to set net neutrality requirements on ISPs unless they were classified as a common carrier. This led the FCC to issue a new Open Internet Order in 2015 that not only continued to enshrine net neutrality principles but also classified ISPs as Title II common carriers. Again, ISPs sued the FCC over this. In 2016, the DC District Court ruled in United States Telecom Ass'n v. FCC in favor of the FCC and upholding the reclassification of ISPs and the neutrality rules.

With Donald Trump becoming president in 2016, Ajit Pai, a current member of the FCC was elevated to the new FCC Commissioner. Pai was a strong critic of the FCC having oversight of net neutrality prior to this position, believing that the FCC should allow ISPs to self-regulate, and that if there was to be regulation on net neutrality, it needed to come from Congress. With Pai as Commissioner, and with Republican-appointed members outnumbering the Democrat-appointed ones 3–2, Pai led the FCC to propose a rollback of the 2015 Open Internet Order. By May 2017, the FCC voted to proceed the process of rolling back the 2015 Order by issuing a public notice of the FCC's intent of the rule change, titled "Restoring Internet Freedom". In addition to the rollback, the proposed rule would prevent states and local governments from passing legislation on net neutrality.

The proposed changed drew heavy criticism from proponents of net neutrality, with several organized activism events created to draw the public's attention to this. During the public commenting period, running from May to August 2017, the FCC received more than 21 million comments related to the change. Analysis of the comments following their release after the public period found a near majority of these opposed to the rule change, even after accounting for potential fraud that had been discovered.  Despite the public stance on the rule change, the FCC voted on December 14, 2017, to enforce the rollback.

Appeals Court
Immediately after the FCC vote in December, several states issued statements of the intent to sue the FCC over this change. Once the rule change was published in the Federal Register in February 2018, twenty-two states and several other state and local agencies joined in the complaint lodged by Mozilla Corporation and Vimeo against the FCC, to be heard in the DC Appeals Court. The suit asserted that the FCC had been "arbitrary and capricious" in handling net neutrality, and disregarded "critical record evidence on industry practices and harm to consumers and businesses".

The case was heard before the DC Appeals Court on February 1, 2019, before Senior Circuit Judge Stephen F. Williams and Circuit Judges Patricia Millett and Robert L. Wilkins. Mozilla and the states argued on points that the FCC, in making the rollback rule, failed to analyze current market conditions correctly, account for public safety, erred in how it classified ISPs as an information service, and asserted that the FCC did not have authority to block states from passing net neutrality laws. The FCC argued that the former net neutrality rules had harmed broadband investment, and that consumers would be protected by required transparency reports from ISPs. Several ISPs and trade groups representing them also joined the FCC to argue that there was evidence to suggest that net neutrality rules were required to prevent consumers from being harmed by aggressive throttling and blocking.

A major point brought up by the judges was related to the 2018 California wildfires, in which it had been discovered that first responders' communications, operating through Verizon, were being throttled due to going over a certain bandwidth capacity, which significantly reduced the effectiveness of the responders to react to the changing fire conditions.

Concurrent actions
While the case was pending in the Appeals Court, California passed the California Internet Consumer Protection and Net Neutrality Act of 2018 in September 2018. The law was written to enforce net neutrality principles for ISPs operating in California. The law was passed despite the fact that the FCC order passed earlier asserted states could not set net neutrality regulations themselves. Shortly after passage, the FCC sued California for this law on the basis of the 2017 rule; the FCC was joined by several ISPs and agencies representing them in suing the state. Both sides agreed to hold off any further legislation or enforcement of the law pending the decision of the Mozilla case.

Decision
The DC Appeals Court issued its decision on October 1, 2019. In the per curiam decision, the Court voted to uphold the FCC's rollback of the 2015 Open Internet Order, ruling that the agency had been affirmed to have that authority through the prior Brand X case and was not at liberty to challenge the Supreme Court ruling there. The decision affirmed several of the points made by the FCC in relation to the potential harm to ISPs by imposing net neutrality, and agreeing that ISPs are more common to information services than common carriers.

However, on the matter of limiting state and local-level enforcement of net neutrality, the Court ruled that the FCC had overstepped its bounds, and reversed that part of the rule. The opinion denied the claim that the FCC had implied authority on this matter, and stated "If Congress wanted Title I to vest the Commission with some form of Dormant-Commerce-Clause-like power to negate States' statutory (and sovereign) authority just by washing its hands of its own regulatory authority, Congress could have said so." In addition, the Court ordered the FCC to review its rule change on the effect for public safety as related to the California wildfire incident, and the impact on low-income telecommunications services.

Each of the three judges wrote an additional opinion. Both Circuit Judges Millett and Wilkens wrote in concurrence of the per curiam decision, while Senior Circuit Judge Williams wrote in part concurrence and part in dissent. All three reflected on the change of the Internet structure since Brand X was decided and pointing out that today, ISPs are better classified as information services than common carriers. At the time of Brand X, the Supreme Court had relied on the existing of core technologies like caching at the ISP level and the Domain Name Service to justify that ISPs are information services. In this ruling, the judges noted that now, Internet services are defined by information that consumers can access, and as such, ISPs should be able to offer those consumers who want faster access to that information the capabilities to offer tiered service without regulation.

Subsequent actions
Because of the Appeals Court decision that only partially upheld the FCC's ruling, either side may seek appeals with the Supreme Court. Parties that supported the plaintiffs, including the Computer & Communications Industry Association, other trade groups, and some of the states that joined with them sought an en banc hearing from the full Appeals Court, but this request was denied in February 2020.

While the decision was seen as a short-term defeat for net neutrality proponents, the decision clearing the way for state and local regulation was seen as net positive. While California's net neutrality law is still barred from enforcement until the FCC's case against the state is complete, state lawmakers saw the decision as a victory since they expect the courts to clear the state of any wrongdoing in passing the legislation. Four other states have passed or have pending legislation to enforce net neutrality at the state level while an additional 33 other states along with the District of Columbia have proposed bills favoring net neutrality. However, it is expected that there will be ongoing legal challenges from ISPs for these state bills that may limit their enforcement.

Another potential route would be for Congress to pass legislation overriding the FCC's decision to classify ISPs as common carriers or otherwise enforce net neutrality. Some lawmakers have attempted to pass such laws, but none has succeeded. There are also concerns that in haste to pass legislation, Congress may support poorly-thought out legislation, or legislation that also contains "trojan horse" clauses favorable to special interests. Mark Stanley of Demand Progress suggested that ISPs and telecomm groups may seek to lobby Congress to pass a weaker form of net neutrality to minimally satisfy its proponents but still would be beneficial to ISPs.

The FCC issued another public commenting period from February to March 2020 to gain input on the factors of public safety, reduced infrastructure spending, and impact on the Lifeline program as identified in the Appeals Court ruling. Following the public comment period, the FCC voted again in October 2020 on the same 3–2 lines to uphold their prior decision, with Pai, in a separate post, stating that based on the public comments he was "confident that the regulatory framework we set forth in the Restoring Internet Freedom Order appropriately and adequately addresses each issue."

References

Further reading

External links
  - "Restoring Internet Freedom" FCC Order, published February 22, 2018
 DC Circuit decision

Federal Communications Commission litigation
History of the Internet
2019 in United States case law
Net neutrality
United States Court of Appeals for the District of Columbia Circuit cases
Mozilla